Eucalyptus baeuerlenii, commonly known as Baeuerlen's gum, is a mallee, sometimes a tree, that is endemic to New South Wales. It has smooth bark throughout, lance-shaped to curved adult leaves, oblong to spindle-shaped buds in groups of three in leaf axils, white flowers and bell-shaped, cup-shaped or conical fruit. It grows in mountain areas in the south of the state.

Description
It has smooth brownish, grey, cream-coloured or green bark. They are the same colour on both surfaces. Flowering mainly occurs from March to May and the flowers are white.

Taxonomy and naming
Eucalyptus baeuerlenii was first formally described in 1890 by Ferdinand von Mueller who published the description in The Victorian Naturalist. 

The type specimen was sent to Mueller by William Baeuerlen, (previously known as Wilhelm Bäuerlen) who collected it on Sugarloaf Mountain (near Clyde Mountain) "near the sources of the Clyde River". Baeuerlen noted "I am always a bit shy about sending you Eucalyptus specimens, but I think that this present one will not waste your time unnecessarily." The specific epithet (baeuerlenii) honours William Baeuerlen who collected for Mueller from 1883 until at least 1888.

Distribution and habitat
Baeuerlen's gum grows in open forest in skeletal soil. It has a disjunct distribution, occurring in the Blue Mountains and on the Southern Tablelands including in the Budawang National Park, Deua National Park and Wadbilliga National Park.

References

baeuerlenii
Myrtales of Australia
Flora of New South Wales
Trees of Australia
Taxa named by Ferdinand von Mueller